Audrey Giacomini (born 20 January 1986) is a French actress and model of Vietnamese origin on her maternal grandfather's side who was half-Vietnamese, half-Italian and half-Breton. She is best known for playing Jeanne in her teenage years in Mr. Nobody (2009). She also played Lisa in Polaroid song (2012) and Ciel Rouge (2017).

Other television credits include Mon père dort au grenier (2009), La taupe 2 (2009), Seconde chance (2009), Strictement platonique (2010), Saïgon, l'été de nos 20 ans (2011).

References

External links 
 

1986 births
French people of Vietnamese descent
French people of Breton descent
French people of Italian descent
Living people
French child actresses
People from Rueil-Malmaison
French female models
French film actresses
French television actresses